Abundance estimation comprises all statistical methods for estimating the number of individuals in a population. In ecology, this may be anything from estimating the number of daisies in a field to estimating the number of blue whales in the ocean.

Plot sampling

Mark-recapture

Distance sampling

References

Further reading
 Distance Sampling: Estimating Abundance of Biological Populations – S. T. Buckland, D. R. Anderson, K. P. Burnham, J. L. Laake
 Estimating Abundance of African Wildlife: An Aid to Adaptive Management – Hugo Jachmann
 Advanced Distance Sampling: Estimating Abundance of Biological Populations
 Geostatistics for Estimating Fish Abundance – J. Rivoirard, J. Simmonds, K. G. Foote, P. Fernandes, N. Bez
 Estimating the Abundance of Arboreal Forage Lichens: User's Guide : a Guide ... – Susan K. Stevenson, Harold M. Armleder, Art N. Lance

Estimation methods